Father Saturnino Urios University, also referred to by its acronym  FSUU, is a private  Roman Catholic coeducational basic and higher education institution run by the Diocese of Butuan in Butuan, Philippines. It offers preschool, elementary, junior & senior high school and college (undergraduate and graduate) courses. It was founded by
Father Saturnino Urios, SJ, a Spanish Jesuit missionary in 1901.

History 
The school is named in honor of its founder Father Saturnino Urios, SJ, a Spanish Jesuit missionary who led the establishment of the institution in 1901. In 2006, then Urios College was elevated into a university. On June 30, 2008, the elementary and high school departments moved to a new campus (Morelos Campus) in Brgy. Libertad. The institution complies with the K-12 program of the Philippine government.

Presidents

Campuses

Notable people 
Gen. Hernando DCA Iriberri – the 46th Chief of Staff of the AFP
Jason James Dy – the grand champion of ABS-CBN's The Voice of the Philippines Season 2
Rep. Ma. Angelica Rosedell Amante-Matba - Agusan del Norte Representative from second District
Atty. Archie Francisco F. Gamboa - the 21st Chief of the Philippine National Police and a lawyer

Sister schools 

 Father Urios Institute of Technology of Ampayon, Inc. (Ampayon, Butuan)
 Father Saturnino Urios College of Bayugan, Inc. (Bayugan)
 Father Saturnino Urios College of Sibagat, Inc. (Sibagat)
 Father Saturnino Urios College of Trento, Inc. (Trento, Agusan del Sur)
 Father Urios Academy of Magallanes, Inc. (Magallanes, Agusan del Norte)
 Father Urios High School - Prosperidad (Prosperidad)
 Mt. Carmel College of San Francisco, Inc. (San Francisco, Agusan del Sur)
 Mt. Carmel High School of Rosario, Inc. (Rosario, Agusan del Sur)
 Our Lady of Carmen Academy of Caraga, Inc. (Carmen, Agusan del Norte)
 Candelaria Institute of Technology of Cabadbaran, Inc. (Cabadbaran)
 Immaculate Heart of Mary Academy - Kitcharao, Inc.  (Kitcharao)
 Saint Michael College of Caraga, Inc. (Nasipit)
 Saint James High School of Buenavista, Inc. (Buenavista, Agusan del Norte)

References

External links 

 

Catholic universities and colleges in the Philippines
Catholic elementary schools in the Philippines
Catholic secondary schools in the Philippines
Nursing schools in the Philippines
Universities and colleges in Butuan